Richard Martin (December 12, 1917 – September 4, 1994) was an American actor. He was best known for his role as Chito Rafferty, the Irish-Mexican western comedy relief sidekick of Tim Holt and Robert Mitchum, among others. Before their pairing, Martin originated the role in the 1943 film Bombardier.

Biography
Though born in Spokane, Washington, Martin's family moved to a Mexican neighbourhood in West Hollywood, California, where he learned to imitate his friends.
He began in films by working as a receptionist for MGM. When a friend made a bet with his agent that the agent couldn't get Martin an actor's contract, Martin's agent won the bet. He became a prolific contract player for RKO Pictures in 1942, often appearing unbilled.

Hollywood's World War II films often featured many ethnic American enlisted men, and Martin first played Chito Rafferty as a contemporary air crewman in Bombardier. He soon repeated the role in the western Nevada opposite Robert Mitchum. He appeared opposite a few other stars in RKO westerns.

After the war, Martin left RKO and essayed the main role in the last Universal Pictures film serial The Mysterious Mr. M as well as the title role in the 1947 Cinecolor western The Adventures of Don Coyote.  When Tim Holt, back from the war, was hired by producer Herman Schlom to star in a western series, the two pondered whom they could get for a sidekick, and Schlom recalled Martin's Rafferty character from Nevada. Martin returned to RKO in the same year in his first appearance alongside Holt in Under the Tonto Rim, the first of 29 films they did together that were initially based on stories by Zane Grey.

As B westerns and exclusive studio contracts gradually ended in the 1950s, Martin found himself out of work and unable to find any due to his ethnic characterisation. He became an insurance salesman, coming back for one last western, Four Fast Guns, in 1960.

Chito Rafferty
Martin originated the Mexican-Irish character of Chito Rafferty, whose full name was "Chito Jose Gonzales Bustamonte Rafferty", in 1943's war film Bombardier. The character went on to appear in a further 34 films, all of them westerns: 1944's Nevada and 1945's West of the Pecos, both of which starred Robert Mitchum; 1945's Wanderer of the Wasteland, which starred James Warren; 1946's Sunset Pass and 1947's Code of the West, in which the role was not played by Martin but by John Laurenz; then a further 29 films, all of which featured Chito Rafferty as the sidekick to a different hero, always played by Tim Holt: Thunder Mountain, Under the Tonto Rim and Wild Horse Mesa in 1947, Western Heritage, The Arizona Ranger, Guns of Hate, Indian Agent and Gun Smugglers in 1948, Brothers in the Saddle, Riders of the Range, Rustlers, Stagecoach Kid, The Mysterious Desperado and Masked Raiders in 1949, Storm Over Wyoming, Rider from Tucson, Dynamite Pass, Border Treasure, Rio Grande Patrol and Law of the Badlands in 1950, Saddle Legion, Gunplay, Pistol Harvest, Hot Lead and Overland Telegraph in 1951, and Trail Guide, Road Agent, Target and Desert Passage in 1952. The character, particularly in the films with Tim Holt's character, was presented as a loyal sidekick and ladies' man who was afraid to commit to long term relationships with the women to whom he was attracted.

Personal life
Martin met his wife, former fashion model and actress Elaine Riley, on a film set in Carmel, where a scheduled four-day shoot stretched to three weeks because of fog He was married to Elaine Riley from 1946 until his death. They worked together only once, in Rider from Tucson (1950), but were regarded as one of Hollywood’s happiest couples.  When Howard Hughes cancelled Martin’s contract at RKO in 1953, he left Hollywood to set up an insurance business. The couple had no children.

Quotes
The Irish in me is for fight; the Mexican for love

Filmography

Notes

External links

1917 births
1994 deaths
American male film actors
Male Western (genre) film actors
American male television actors
RKO Pictures contract players
20th-century American male actors